Mountain Meadow Ranch (MMR) is a family-owned two-week summer camp for boys and girls aged 7–17, located near Susanville, California, United States, on the eastern slope of the Sierra Nevada, 75 miles northwest of Reno, Nevada. It boasts one of the highest return rates of any camp, averaging about 70% campers returning the next year.

History
Originally a hunting camp for the indigenous Maidu Native Americans, in 1902 the ranch came under the ownership of wealthy hunter George Wingfield, who first homesteaded the area. The ranch was called "Meadowbrook" at this time, and had two small "lakes" nearby named "Lake George" (right next to the big house) and "Lake Jean", after George Wingfield's children. After going through several changes, Mountain Meadow Ranch was founded as an all-boys summer camp in 1956 by professional football player Jack Ellena Sr. and his wife Jacquie Ellena when they acquired it shortly after Jack graduated from UCLA. At the insistence of sisters, the camp opened to girls in the early 1960s, and it has been open to both sexes ever since.

Activities
Mountain Meadow offers a wide range of activities, including:

 Equestrianism
 Mountain biking
 BMX biking
 Riflery
 Archery
 Tennis
 Drama
 Ceramics
 Arts and crafts
 Photography
 Swimming
 Sailing
 Canoeing
 Fishing
 Fencing
 Campfires
 Basketball
 Baseball
 Association football
 American football
 Lake sports
 Water skiing
 Wakeboarding
 Kneeboarding
 Tubing
 Adventure and challenge activities
 High ropes course
 Low ropes course
 Backpacking trips
 Water-ski overnights
 Archeology expeditions
 Desert adventures
 Summit expeditions
 C.I.L.T. (Campers in Leadership Training)

Staff and directors
The ranch is owned by Jack "Chip" Ellena Jr. and wife Jody Ellena, who have been running the camp as head directors since 1993. Co-directors are their daughter Katherine & Brandon Whitestone. The staff and counselors at Mountain Meadow are typically between the ages of 19-24 and most have completed at least one year of college.

Philosophy
Mountain Meadow states its philosophy is to provide a fun, safe environment for children to enjoy their summers, offering new experiences and allowing development of new social and physical skills.

Camp family
While Mountain Meadow offers range of high-quality activities, the directors assert it is the sense of camp family that keeps campers coming back year after year. Limited enrollment of 115 campers per session (max capacity) and sessions of 2 weeks or more in duration, are at the heart of creating this family-like environment.  Described as a "home away from home" by many returners, Mountain Meadow aims to be a place where one can forget one's insecurities and be oneself.

Áj Ypékanbe
A Maidu saying meaning "serve all", the principles of Aj Ypekanbe (ajsh-ip-ay-kan-bee) were introduced in the summer of 2005 by co-directors Chuck and Cascia to target the "core ideal of the Mountain Meadow Camp Family".  It aims to help campers and staff alike to grow as individuals and improve their character traits, enhancing the camp experience as a whole. The six core characteristics are:
 Inclusiveness
 Listening
 Empathy
 Encouragement
 Stewardship
 Service

References

External links
 Official website

Summer camps in California
Buildings and structures in Lassen County, California